Albert Marie Adolphe Dagnaux (10 July 1861, in Paris – 22 November 1933, in Mantes-la-Jolie) was a French landscape, tableaux and figure painter.

Biography 
His father was the owner of a small restaurant, "Le Dagnaux", in the 6th arrondissement of Paris. He began his studies in 1878 at the École nationale supérieure des beaux-arts under Professor Ernest Victor Hareux. His first exhibit was in 1883, at the Salon, but he received no recognition.

In 1890, he left the Salon to join the Société Nationale des Beaux-Arts, founded by Jean-Louis-Ernest Meissonier. It was at that time that he began to receive positive critical attention. His first major success came with his tableau Avenue du Bois de Boulogne; Le Club des Pannés, in 1893. Another tableau, Le jardin du général aux Invalides, was presented at the Exposition Universelle (1900).

Among his other works are the three frescoes in the refectory of the Lycée Fénelon (Les Jeux de l'enfance et de la jeunesse, Le Martin-pêcheur, Le nid) and a large panorama representing the fifth appearance of the Virgin Mary to Bernadette Soubirous, produced under the direction of Pierre and Louis-Robert Carrier-Belleuse.

A street in Mantes-la-Jolie was named in his honor.

References

Further reading 
 Dominique Lobstein, Albert Dagnaux, entre impressionnisme et naturalisme, Musée de l'Hôtel-Dieu (2009)

External links 

 Albert Dagnaux website
 ArtNet: More works by Dagnaux

1861 births
1933 deaths
Painters from Paris
École des Beaux-Arts alumni
19th-century French painters
French male painters
20th-century French painters
20th-century French male artists
19th-century French male artists